Tamarack "Tam" R. Czarnik is an American medical researcher, notable for space advocacy and academic studies of human physiology in extreme environmental conditions. Czarnik is especially known for his scientific contributions to space medicine as well as a better understanding of such phenomena as ebullism and uncontrolled decompression. He is the author of a number of publications in the domain of bioastronautics including "Ebullism at 1 million feet: Surviving Rapid/Explosive Decompression" and "Medical emergencies in space". Czarnik was at the origin of the Mars Society Chapter foundation in Dayton, Ohio, and also served as the chapter's first Chair. From 2001 to 2011, Czarnik served in several missions as Medical Director for the Mars Society's FMARS and MDRS, simulated Mars habitats.

Background and medical career
Tam Czarnik is originally from Wisconsin. He graduated with honors from Ohio State University College of Medicine in 
medicine residency in Casper, WY. 
During his medical career as a family doctor, Czarnik was affiliated with many hospitals including Marbleton/Big Piney Clinic, Altru Hospital (Nelson County Health System) and more. Beginning in September 2009, he worked as a family practice physician in McVille, ND and other nearby locations until his retirement in 2019.

Aerospace medical research and the Mars Society
After completing his first residency, Czarnik pursued additional training in aerospace medicine at Wright State University. During his residency in Aerospace Medicine and Hypobaric Medicine, Czarnik's research mainly focused on studies of space exposure and the 
effect of spaceflight on the human body including ebullism, decompression, reactions to drugs, physical activity and medical treatment during spaceflight. In 2004, Czarnik published his thesis on muscle degeneration in long-duration human spaceflight. That same year, he graduated from WSU with an M.S degree. He also joined the Mars Society and was among the co-founders of its Ohio Chapter in Dayton in 1998. During his activity in the Mars Society, Czarnik published a number of works that contributed to further development of aerospace medicine in the field of medical emergencies and integration of remote access medical devices into spacesuits, allowing remote diagnosis and treatment modalities in situ.

His studies led him to participate in FMARS and MDRS missions where he served as the medical director and flight surgeon for several crew missions from 2001 to 2011. Czarnik is an ardent advocate of space exploration and the human exploration of Mars.

Selected works
Czarnik, R. T., The Remote Access Medical Suit, Space Times, (November/December 2005) 
Czarnik, R. T.,Medical Emergencies in Space, Space Times, (March/April 2005) 
Czarnik, R. T., Medical Research in the Mars Society, Journal of Pharmacy Practice (April 1, 2003) 
Czarnik, R.T., Countermeasures to long-duration spaceflight (Parts I,II), Wright State University 
Czarnik, R.T., Aerospace medicine 101: Adaptations to spaceflight, Mars Society 
Czarnik, R.T., Artificial Gravity: Current Concerns and Design Considerations, Wright State University, (March 1999) 
Czarnik, R. T., Ebullism at 1 million feet: Surviving Rapid/Explosive Decompression, Wright State University, (1999). 
Czarnik, R. T., Vernikos, J., Physiological changes in spaceflight that may affect drug action, Journal of Gravitational Physiology (July 1999)

See also 
 Effect of spaceflight on the human body 
 Mars analog habitat 
 Medical treatment during spaceflight

External links
Google Scholar profile 
 Description of space medicine

References

Living people
Space medicine
Space advocates
American science writers
Mars Society
American medical researchers
Ohio State University College of Medicine alumni
Wright State University alumni
Year of birth missing (living people)